Aadesh Chaudhary is an Indian television actor. He is known for his role of Vikrant Mehta in the TV show Sasural Simar Ka on Colors TV.

Early life
Chaudhary comes from Aligarh, Uttar Pradesh. He completed his education in Engineering and later entered in the acting career. While struggling to get roles in television, Chaudhary also worked in theatre along with actor Kader Khan.

Career

Television

References

External links
 

Indian male television actors
Living people
People from Aligarh
Indian male soap opera actors
21st-century Indian male actors
Year of birth missing (living people)